Dobrynino is a rural locality (a village) in Tolpukhovskoye Rural Settlement, Sobinsky District, Vladimir Oblast, Russia. The population was 81 as of 2010. There are 5 streets.

Geography 
Dobrynino is located on the Koloksha River, 23 km north of Sobinka (the district's administrative centre) by road. Sheldyakovo is the nearest rural locality.

References 

Rural localities in Sobinsky District